The 1967–68 WHL season was the 16th season of the Western Hockey League. Five teams played a 72-game schedule, and the Seattle Totems were the Lester Patrick Cup champions, defeating the Portland Buckaroos four games to one in the final series. The Los Angeles Blades ceased operations, when the Los Angeles Kings joined the National Hockey League as an expansion team.

Final Standings 

bold - qualified for playoffs

Playoffs 

The Seattle Totems defeated the Portland Buckaroos 4 games to 1 to win the Lester Patrick Cup.

References

Western Hockey League (1952–1974) seasons
1967–68 in American ice hockey by league
1967–68 in Canadian ice hockey by league